Super Breakout is a sequel to the 1976 video game Breakout released in arcades in September 1978 by Atari, Inc. It was written by Ed Rotberg. The game uses the same mechanics as Breakout, but allows the selection of three distinct game modes via a knob on the cabinet—two of which involve multiple, simultaneous balls in play. Both the original and sequel are in black and white with monitor overlays to add color. It was distributed in Japan by Namco and Esco Trading.

The arcade game was commercially successful in Japan and the United States. Atari published home versions–in color–for most of its consoles and computers, including as the pack-in game for the 1982 Atari 5200.

Gameplay
The fundamental gameplay—use a paddle to bounce a ball into a wall of destructible bricks—is the same as Breakout, but Super Breakout contains three different game modes:

Double gives the player control of two paddles at the same time—one placed above the other—with two balls in-play simultaneously.

Cavity also has two paddles, but initially only one ball. Two others are contained in pockets inside the wall and can be freed.

Progressive advances the entire wall downward step by step, gaining in speed the longer the ball is in play.

Development
The game was written by Ed Rotberg, who later designed Battlezone (1980) for Atari. Rotberg developed Super Breakout after hearing that Atari founder Nolan Bushnell wanted Breakout updated.
 While the original was constructed with discrete logic instead of a microprocessor, Super Breakout uses a MOS Technology 6502 CPU. Like Breakout, Super Breakout uses a black and white display with overlays to simulate color.

Ports
Super Breakout appeared as a cartridge for the Atari 8-bit family in 1979 with support for up to 8 players taking turns.  A port for the Atari VCS (later renamed the Atari 2600) was available at the end of 1981, initially as a Sears exclusive release under the Tele-Games branding. An Atari branded version was then released in January of 1982.  The VCS port includes two "Children's Version" games that require less skill to play.  Four years after release, Super Breakout became the pack-in game for the then-new Atari 5200 console in 1982. Prior home versions use paddle controllers; the 5200 port uses the system's analog joysticks.

An Atari ST version developed by Pardox was published by Atari UK in 1987. Majesco released Super Breakout for the Game Boy in 1998 and Game Boy Color in 1999. Both the Atari ST and Game Boy versions have sculpted bricks similar to those of the Breakout-inspired Arkanoid.

All of the home ports also include a version of the original game simply as Breakout.

Reception
In Japan, it was the ninth highest-earning arcade video game of 1978. In the United States, it was the eighth highest-earning arcade video game of 1979. Atari sold a total of 4,805 Super Breakout arcade cabinets. 

In regard to Super Breakout being included with every Atari 5200, David H. Ahl of Creative Computing Video & Arcade Games, wrote in 1983:

In 1995, Flux magazine ranked Super Breakout 93rd on their "Top 100 Video Games."

Legacy
For Kid Stuff Records, John Braden recorded a 7-in 33 RPM record telling the story of Super Breakout. This science fiction story dealt with NASA astronaut Captain John Stewart Chang returning from a routine mission transporting titanium ore from Io to space station New California. He encounters a rainbow barrier, presumably a force of nature, that seems to have no end on either side.  He has three lobbing missiles of white light that he can bounce off the hull of his shuttle, and they prove able to break through the layers of the force field.  With his life support systems failing, what follows is a test of endurance turned game as he strives to break through the barrier in space.

Glu Mobile released a licensed cellular phone version. In 2008, Atari released the game for the iPhone and iPod Touch via Apple's App Store.

References

External links

Super Breakout for the Atari 2600 at Atari Mania
Super Breakout for the Atari 8-bit family at Atari Mania
Super Breakout for the Atari 5200 at Atari Mania

1978 video games
Arcade video games
Atari arcade games
Atari 2600 games
Atari 5200 games
Atari 8-bit family games
Atari ST games
Game Boy Color games
Multiplayer and single-player video games
Paddle-and-ball video games
Vertically-oriented video games
Video games developed in the United States